RiteSite.com is an online career development center for senior business and non-profit executives.  It is supported by executive membership fees; there is no charge to employers and recruiters to advertise executive jobs paying over $100,000/year.  Services to executive members include facilities for online global introduction and networking, connection with leading (“Rites-Honored”) executive search firms, and resume posting in two searchable databases—one with access restricted to members of the leading search firms and the other open to the World Wide Web.  Members receive twice-weekly career development publications.  Job opportunities are published within the site and members are also directed to personally appropriate positions published elsewhere.

Matrixed classifications

To facilitate interaction, both executive members and job opportunities are classified in a Linnaeus-like manner using 57 industries and, within each, 17 functions.  This method of finding exactly what is sought is at the core of RiteSite.  In addition, the site also provides conventional keyword searching.

Origin and background

John Lucht, author of the Rites of Passage at $100,000+ executive career handbook, began identifying and publishing a list of retainer-compensated U.S. and Canadian executive search firms and included it in the initial (1986) edition of Rites of Passage.  In 1995, RiteSite.com was founded to make that information  downloadable.  The automatic sending of resumes to the executive's choices among the top search firms (using the executive's own email address) was launched in 2004.   The posting of executive jobs and identity-revealed and identity-concealed resumes was implemented in 2001.  Computerized matching of executives for personal networking unhampered by geographic location began in 2003.

External links
Company web site

Personal development